CANalyzer is an analysis software tool from Vector Informatik GmbH. This development software is primarily used by automotive and electronic control unit suppliers to analyze the data traffic in serial bus systems. The most relevant bus systems to CANalyzer are CAN, LIN, FlexRay, Ethernet and MOST, as well as CAN-based protocols such as J1939, CANopen, and ARINC 825.

History 
Vector first offered CANalyzer on the market in 1992, and has been continually updating it since then. Today it is considered one of the world’s leading analysis tools for CAN buses. Besides its primary field of application, which is in-vehicle electronic networking in the automotive industry, CANalyzer is also used in many other industries such as rail transportation, heavy-duty vehicles, special-purpose vehicles, avionics, and medical technology. New technologies based on IP architectures in the automotive industry  are supported by CANalyzer.

In addition to its robust bus monitoring functionality, CANalyzer also contains many stimulation and analysis functions for triggering and analyzing message traffic and data contents. These functions are incorporated in a measurement setup. Users can configure and extend the tool’s functionality with an integrated compiling programming language.
Data is displayed and evaluated in both raw and symbolic formats.

Back in 1992, Vector had already developed the DBC data format, which has become the de facto standard in the automotive industry for exchanging CAN descriptions. Relevant standards are supported for other bus systems as well, such as FIBEX for FlexRay, LDF for LIN and EDS/DCF/XDD for CANopen.

Versions 
CANalyzer version 1.0 was released in 1992.  CANalyzer is available in different variants.

See also 
 CANoe
 CANape

References

External links 
CANalyzer website

Additional resources 
 Pfeiffer, Ayre, Keydel: Embedded Networking with CAN and CANopen, RTC Books San Clemente, USA, 2003 (eng)
 Pfeiffer, Ayre, Keydel: Embedded Networking with CAN and CANopen, RTC Books, Japan, 2006 (jap)
 CAN-Show-Premiere, Report about the CiA booth on the fair Interkama 1992, in Markt&Technik Nr.45, November 6, 1992 (German)
 Develop CAN applications faster - CAN tools: News at a glance, in Markt&Technik Nr.45, November 6, 1992 (German)

Computer-aided engineering software
Data analysis software
Networking with CAN and CANopen, RTC Books San Clemente, USA, 2003 (eng)
 Pfeiffer, Ayre, Keydel: Embedded Networking with CAN and CANopen'', RTC Books, Japan, 2006 (jap)